Asha-Rose Mtengeti Migiro (born 9 July 1956) is a Tanzanian politician and diplomat who was the Deputy Secretary-General of the United Nations from 2007 to 2012.  She was appointed as the United Nations Secretary-General's Special Envoy for HIV/AIDS in Africa on 13 July 2012.

Early life and education
Born at Songea in Ruvuma Region, Migiro commenced her education at Mnazi Mmoja Primary School in 1963. She later moved on to Korogwe Primary School, Weruweru Secondary School, and, finally, Korogwe Secondary School, where she graduated high school in 1975.

She obtained her LL.B and LL.M from the University of Dar es Salaam and her PhD in 1992 from the University of Konstanz in Germany. Before entering politics, she was a senior lecturer at the Faculty of Law at the University of Dar es Salaam (UDSM). She headed the Department of Constitution and Administrative Law from 1992 to 1994 and the Department of Civil and Criminal Law from 1994 to 1997.

Time in the Tanzanian government

Migiro served as a ward member of Chama Cha Mapinduzi from 1994 to 2000, and as a member of a Regional Executive Council from 2000 to 2005. From 2000 to 2006, she was the Minister of Community Development, Gender and Children's Affairs. She became the Minister of Foreign Affairs and International Cooperation on 4 January 2006, when the previous foreign minister, Jakaya Kikwete, who had been elected president, appointed his new cabinet. She was the first woman in that position since the independence of the United Republic of Tanzania.

While in the position of foreign minister, Migiro chaired the Council of Ministers' meetings of the International Conference of the Great Lakes Region and the Southern African Development Community(SADC) Ministerial Committee of the Organ on Politics, Defense and Security Cooperation. She coordinated SADC assistance to the elections in the Democratic Republic of the Congo (DRC), Zambia and Madagascar. She also served as President of the United Nations Security Council during its open debate on peace, security and development in the Great Lakes Region.

Serving as foreign minister, Migiro accompanied the former president of the Comoros, Azali Assoumani, during a tour of his country's new consulate in Tanzania and inspected a Tanzanian hospital. According to United States officials, Condoleezza Rice, the American Secretary of State, is "personally acquainted" with her. Kikwete appointed Bernard Membe to succeed Migiro as foreign minister in January 2007.

United Nations appointment
Migiro was appointed to the post of United Nations Deputy Secretary-General by Ban Ki-moon, the new United Nations Secretary-General from South Korea, on 5 January 2007. According to Ban, "She is a highly respected leader who has championed the cause of developing countries over the years..." He also said that "Through her distinguished service in diverse areas, she has displayed outstanding management skills with wide experience and expertise in socio-economic affairs and development issues." According to The New York Times, this was a fulfilment of his promise to pick a woman from the developing world for the post of Deputy Secretary-General. The UN News Centre noted that Migiro and Ban had worked together while they were foreign ministers of their respective countries.  She was formally appointed and assumed office on 1 February 2007.

During her time at the United Nations, Migiro was also a member of the Commission on Effective Development Cooperation with Africa which was set up by the Prime Minister Anders Fogh Rasmussen of Denmark and held meetings between April and October 2008. In September 2009, she travelled to Rome and had a meeting with Italian foreign minister Franco Frattini and Pope Benedict XVI to discuss violence against women. United Nations representatives were reportedly preparing to finalise an initiative aimed at stopping the genital mutilation of women and genocide.

Migiro served as Deputy Secretary-General until June 2012.

Later career
After serving at the United Nations, Migiro returned to Tanzania and was appointed cabinet minister in the cabinet of Jakaya Kikwete. She later entered the race to become the CCM candidate in the 2015 presidential elections, but lost the nomination to the eventual winner John Magufuli.

President Magufuli appointed Migiro as High Commissioner to the United Kingdom in May 2016.

Personal life
She is married to Cleophas Migiro, and the couple has two daughters.

References

External links

UN Deputy Secretary-General
Ban Ki-moon's full statement about Migiro's appointment
 Literature by Migiro in the German National Library
 黑人女性首次成为联合国副秘書長
United Nations Rule of Law: Message from the Chair, a message from the United Nations Deputy Secretary-General on the rule of law.

1956 births
Living people
Chama Cha Mapinduzi MPs
Nominated Tanzanian MPs
Foreign ministers of Tanzania
Female foreign ministers
Female justice ministers
Tanzanian officials of the United Nations
Deputy Secretaries-General of the United Nations
Weruweru Secondary School alumni
University of Dar es Salaam alumni
University of Konstanz alumni
Academic staff of the University of Dar es Salaam
High Commissioners of Tanzania to the United Kingdom
21st-century Tanzanian women politicians
Women government ministers of Tanzania
Tanzanian women diplomats
Women ambassadors
Special Envoys of the Secretary-General of the United Nations